Echeta juno is a moth of the family Erebidae. It was described by William Schaus in 1892. It is found in French Guiana and Brazil.

References

Phaegopterina
Moths of South America
Moths described in 1892